The commune of Bukemba is a commune of Rutana Province in southeastern Burundi. The capital lies at Bukemba.

Places in the commune 
Gihofi

References

Communes of Burundi
Rutana Province